Tacony may refer to:

Companies
 Tacony Corporation, a St. Louis, Missouri-based manufacturer and wholesale distributor of vacuum cleaners, sewing machines, ceiling fans, and commercial floor care equipment

Places
 Tacony, Philadelphia, Pennsylvania, an area of northeast Philadelphia
 Tacony (SEPTA station), a railroad station in the Tacony section of Philadelphia, Pennsylvania
 Tacony Creek, a creek in Philadelphia, which is also known as Tookany Creek and Frankford Creek along different portions of its course
 Tacony Music Hall, an historic building in the Tacony section of Philadelphia, Pennsylvania
 Tacony-Palmyra Bridge, a bridge connecting Palmyra, New Jersey and the Tacony section of Philadelphia, Pennsylvania
 Tacony Plantation in Vidalia, Louisiana, US

Ships
 CSS Tacony, a Confederate naval vessel in commission briefly in June 1863
 USS Tacony, the name of more than one ship of the United States Navy

Sports
 Tacony Disston, an early twentieth-century U.S. soccer team from Tacony, Philadelphia, Pennsylvania